Ronaldo Lumungo Afonso (born 11 July 2000), sometimes known as just Ronaldo,  is a Santomean footballer who plays as a winger for Loures and the São Tomé and Príncipe national team.

International career
Neves made his professional debut with the São Tomé and Príncipe national team in a 2–0 2018 African Nations Championship qualification loss to Cameroon on 12 August 2017.

References

External links
 
 
 NFT Profile

2000 births
Living people
São Tomé and Príncipe footballers
São Tomé and Príncipe international footballers
Association football wingers
Campeonato de Portugal (league) players
São Tomé and Príncipe expatriate footballers
São Tomé and Príncipe expatriates in Portugal
Expatriate footballers in Portugal